The women's 3,000 metres at the 2010 World Junior Championships in Athletics was held at the Moncton 2010 Stadium on 19 July.

Medalists

Records
Prior to the competition, the existing world junior and championship records were as follows.

no new records were established during the competition.

Results

Key:  NJR = National junior record, PB = Personal best, SB = Seasonal best, WJL = World junior leading

Participation
According to an unofficial count, 22 athletes from 15 countries participated in the event.

References

External links
3,000 metres results. IAAF. Retrieved on 2010-07-22.
13th IAAF World Junior Championships Facts & Figures. IAAF. Retrieved on 2010-07-22.

3,000 metres
Long distance running at the World Athletics U20 Championships
2010 in women's athletics